Błonie is a town west of Warsaw, Poland.

Błonie may also refer to:
Błonie, Kuyavian-Pomeranian Voivodeship (north-central Poland)
Błonie, Lower Silesian Voivodeship (south-west Poland)
Błonie, Lesser Poland Voivodeship (south Poland)
Błonie, Łęczyca County in Łódź Voivodeship (central Poland)
Błonie, Radomsko County in Łódź Voivodeship (central Poland)
Błonie, Lubusz Voivodeship (west Poland)
Błonie, Lublin Voivodeship (east Poland)
Błonie, Piaseczno County in Masovian Voivodeship (east-central Poland)
Błonie, Subcarpathian Voivodeship (south-east Poland)
Błonie, Świętokrzyskie Voivodeship (south-central Poland)